Karl Endres (15 June 1911 – 29 December 1993) was a German basketball player. He competed in the men's tournament at the 1936 Summer Olympics.

References

1911 births
1993 deaths
German men's basketball players
Olympic basketball players of Germany
Basketball players at the 1936 Summer Olympics
People from Würzburg (district)
Sportspeople from Lower Franconia